The 2019 TCR Europe Touring Car Series was the fourth season of TCR Europe Touring Car Series, and second held as a standalone series. The season began at the Hungaroring in April and ended at the Autodromo Nazionale Monza in October.

As part of an deal with the series' promoters, at five of the seven events, the 2019 TCR BeNeLux Touring Car Championship series is held which is its fourth edition. Also a third competition will be held with the establishment of the TCR Eastern Europe Trophy which will be held on two of the seven events of the calendar, as well as having four standalone events.

Mikel Azcona is the defending drivers' champion, while Hell Energy Racing with KCMG are the defending teams' champions. In TCR BeNeLux Jean-Karl Vernay is the defending drivers' champion while Leopard Lukoil Team WRT are the defending teams' champions.

Calendar 
The calendar was announced on 5 December 2018 with 7 rounds scheduled. The second round, which was scheduled to be held at unknown venue in the Netherlands, was replaced on 28 January 2019 with Hockenheimring. Five of the seven events from the calendar are also valid for the TCR BeNeLux Touring Car Championship.

Teams and drivers

Mid-season changes

Following a post-race altercation with Natan Bihel after the second race at the Red Bull Ring, Dušan Borković was banned from participating in all remaining rounds of the season.

Results and standings

Season summary

TCR Europe standings

Drivers' standings 
Scoring system

† – Drivers did not finish the race, but were classified as they completed over 75% of the race distance.

Teams' standings

† – Drivers did not finish the race, but were classified as they completed over 75% of the race distance.

TCR BeNeLux Drivers' standings 

† – Drivers did not finish the race, but were classified as they completed over 75% of the race distance.

TCR BeNeLux Teams' standings

Notes

References

External links
 
 

2019 in European sport
Europe Touring Car Series